The Beer Lovers Party (PLP; ; Partiya lyubiteley piva, PLP) was created in Russia on December 26, 1993, and officially registered on August 9, 1994. By the moment of registration the party listed 1,700 members.

History 

Initially it was a kind of practical joke, supposedly created in an analogy with the Polish Beer-Lovers Party. Its documents read as a parody on political cliches in party programmes. For example, its goal was "protection of interests of beer lovers regardless of racial, national, or religious affiliation". Among demands was decrease of taxes for beer manufacturers. It has fractions of "light beer lovers", "dark beer lovers", "kvass patriot fraction", etc.

It was supported by a number of Russian entrepreneurs in the context of 1995 Russian legislative election, and its documents were rewritten into a more serious style.  Among its goals now was the "protection of interests of beer lovers that do not contradict the law". The party now stood for "efficient means for preservation of main natural resources, such as land, air, and especially water, which is the basis of a good beer". Among its official slogans were "Replete and Safe Life" ("Сытая и безопасная жизнь") and "Clever and Calm Politicians Grasping not only Beer". Its platform stated that the Party "will defend interests not only beer lovers, but also lovers of sausage, butter, meat, tea, kvass and other lovers, with the exception of lovers of power". It was branched into about 60 regions of Russia, the largest ones being in Moscow, Komi Republic, Chuvashia, Irkutsk Oblast, Saratov Oblast and Moscow Oblast. By the moment of elections it enlisted over 50,000 members. During the election into the State Duma (second convocation) it gained 0.62% of votes, way below the 5% election threshold. Vladimir Pribylovsky was among the candidates nominated by the party.

After the failure, the sponsors dropped their support and the party de facto ceased to exist and was not re-registered in 1998. Still, many branches of the Party continue to exist as formal and informal associations.

Sponsors and finance 
Промрадтехбанк  - Promradtechbank;
АО "Управление перспективных технологий" - "Promising Technology Management";
КБ "Платина"  - Platina;
ТОО Фирма "Русич"  - Rusich;
ТОО "Артиль"  - Artil;
АООТ "Телекомпания ВКТ" - VKT Television;
МАКБ "Возрождение" - Rebirth Bank;
ООО "Корпорация НР-Телеком"  - NR Telecom Corporation;
ТОО "Финтраст"  - FinTrust;
АКБ "МБТС-Банк" - MBTS Bank;
АО "Московская телекоммуникационная корпорация" - Moscow Telecommunications Corporation.

Total donation by sponsors: 697,300,000 rubles (1995). 115 million was allocated by the Central Election Commission. About 777 million was supplied by individuals and companies. In total, the party had spent about 1.07 billion rubles for the election campaign.

See also
List of frivolous political parties

References

External links
List of 1995 Duma electorate unions
Voronezh BLP website

Defunct political parties in Russia
Political parties established in 1993
Political parties disestablished in 1998
Beer political parties
1993 establishments in Russia
Consumer organizations in Russia